Michael Nielsen (born 15 February 1975) is a Danish cyclist. He competed in the men's team pursuit at the 1996 Summer Olympics.

Major results
1993
 National Junior Track Championships
1st  Individual pursuit
1st  Points race
1995
 1st  Team pursuit, National Track Championships
1997
 1st  Road race, National Under-23 Road Championships
 1st Fyen Rundt
1998
 1st Stage 4a Danmark Rundt
1999
 1st  Team pursuit, National Track Championships
 1st Stage 5 Danmark Rundt
 3rd Time trial, National Road Championships
2000
 8th Ronde van Midden-Zeeland

References

External links
 

1975 births
Living people
Danish male cyclists
Olympic cyclists of Denmark
Cyclists at the 1996 Summer Olympics
People from Køge Municipality
Sportspeople from Region Zealand